Josh Larsen (born May 12, 1972) is a former American motorcycle speedway rider who was a member of the winning American 1993 Speedway World Team Cup team, rode in the 1994 World Individual Speedway Final and in the 1995 Speedway Grand Prix as permanent rider.

Career 

Larsen first came to ride in Europe for Arena Essex in the English league, upon the 'Hammers' elevation to the First Division in 1992. He'd been widely touted as the latest sensation to come out of the United States - a reputation he'd more than live up to come the end of his two initial seasons with the club. Josh started the season in the reserve berth, proving a useful man to have in that position and putting all of his small track experience to good use around the Arena-Essex Raceway. 

Josh made real progress in 1993, though, when he built upon his debutant year to improve his average significantly. He was a match winner on multiple occasions, scoring countless 5-1's at home alongside Hammers no.1 rider Leigh Adams and helping the USA to World Team Cup victory at Coventry. Josh was so popular that a coach load of Hammers fans travelled to the Czech Republic to cheer him on in the World Under-21 championship - a meeting which was eventually won by Mikael Karlsson (now Max) with Josh finishing sixth. 

But come 1994 and Larsen dropped a bombshell on the Hammers - he was staying at home to train as a fireman. It was a devastating blow for the club, particularly as the side were forced to start the season without a recognised third heat leader. Josh continued to ride in the US and in world championship rounds - he made his world final debut at Vojens that year, finishing high enough up the leader board to qualify for the inaugural Grand Prix series in 1995. 

With Josh a fully fledged GP rider and faced with a busy European season, he returned 'home' to Arena-Essex in '95. Sadly for both him and Hammers fans, a serious back injury sustained in Germany sidelined him for two months and put paid to his World Championship aspirations. 
Larsen moved with the promotion to the London Lions in 1996 and switched to Bradford in 1997 when the Hackney side shut, helping the Dukes to Elite League success. He stayed at home in 1998 before returning to Britain the following season to ride for Eastbourne. A long absence from Britain followed, by which time Josh was working as a camera assistant for a large US production company. 

An unrewarding spell at Belle Vue in 2003 looked to have signalled the end of Josh's UK racing aspirations - but the Hammers' membership of the Elite League in 2004 resulted in a third spell at Arena-Essex for the popular American when it was clear he was keen to return. 
Once he'd adapted to life back in Britain he proved a useful asset - but 2005 was a different story. He struggled for points early on and then fought a seemingly never-ending battle against injury - he hurt his back riding for his country; suffered a broken ankle against Coventry; and snapped his collarbone at Eastbourne to put a premature end to his season and - to date - his British career.

World Final appearances
 1994 -  Vojens, Speedway Center - 9th - 7pts

Speedway Grand Prix results

Career details
World (European) U-21 Championship
 1993 -  Pardubice - 5th - 8pts

Speedway World Team Cup
 1993 -  Coventry, Coventry Stadium - Winner - 40pts (5)
 1999 -  Pardubice - 3rd - 29pts (2)

See also
 United States national speedway team
 List of Speedway Grand Prix riders

References

1972 births
Living people
American speedway riders